The Mukwano Group of Companies, commonly known as the Mukwano Group, is a conglomerate based in Uganda,  with operations in other East African countries.

Location
The Group's headquarters are located on Mukwano Road (Bypass Road), in the Central Division of Kampala, Uganda's capital and largest city. The coordinates of the company headquarters are: 0°18'45.0"N, 32°35'27.0"E (Latitude:0.312500; Longitude:32.590840).

Overview
The group was established in 1986, although it did not start operations until 1989. As of October 2016, the group is involved in six main areas of business: (a) manufacturing (b) real estate investments (c) bulk storage & shipment (d) cargo clearing & forwarding (e) agriculture and (f) financial services. Mukwano Group is one of the most active investment groups in Uganda. The group won the coveted Annual Presidential Award of Best Exporter of the Year for 2004. In 2009, its beverages division attained ISO Certification.

Subsidiary companies
The subsidiary companies of  the Mukwano Group include but are not limited to the following:
AK Transporters Uganda Limited; a fully licensed and equipped logistics and transport company with over 200 light, medium and heavy transport  trucks.
Gulf Stream Investments Limited; a bulk liquid-storage terminal within the port area of Mombasa, Kenya. The terminal can store close to 26,000 metric tonnes of vegetable oils, oil derivatives and related chemicals in dedicated tanks.
Exim Bank (Uganda); a retail commercial bank jointly owned with Exim Bank (Tanzania).
Lira Maize Factory Limited; located in Lira, Lira District, Northern Uganda.
Lira Oil Mill Limited; which produces in excess of 25,000 tons of oil annually, from sunflower and cottonseed, since 2007.
Mukwano Agro Project Limited; which consists of over  under cultivation in Masindi District. Crops include maize, soybeans, sunflower, and simsim.
Mukwano AK Plastics; which manufactures  household and industrial plastic products.
Mukwano Dar es Salaam Factory; located in Dar es Salaam, Tanzania, the factory has manufactured edible oil and soap since 2004.
Mukwano Industries Limited, a manufacturer of edible oil, soaps, cleaning products, sanitary products, household and industrial plastic products, bottled water and energy drinks.
Mukwano Sugar Factory; a licensed sugar manufacturer, located in Masindi District, with capacity to process 2,500 metric tonnes of raw sugarcane daily (912,000 tonnes annually).
Nationwide Properties Limited; a real-estate development company that builds commercial and residential properties. Nationwide is a joint venture between the Mukwano Group and Property Services Limited, a real estate management firm in Uganda.
Riley Packaging Limited; the largest producer of packaging materials in East Africa, a joint venture between Mukwano Group and Raps Limited, another Ugandan company. The factory, estimated at US$13 million, is located in Mukono on the Kampala-Jinja Highway.

Products
The products of the Group include, but are not limited to the following:

 Aqua Sipi bottled water
 Kyekyo energy drinks
 Mukwano edible cooking oil
 Roki fortified edible cooking oil
 Three Star fortified edible cooking oil
 Marina margarine
 Tamu baking fat 
 Sunseed edible sunflower oil
 Nice Fry edible cooking fat
 Nice Fry vegetable frying fat
 Royal Palms Housing Estate - A gated residential community, located at Butabika, by road, southeast of the central business district of Kampala, on the shores of Lake Victoria.

See also
 Kampala Capital City Authority
 Kampala Central Division
 List of banks in Uganda
 List of conglomerates in Uganda
 List of sugar manufacturers in Uganda
 List of wealthiest people in Uganda

References

External links
 
 About Mukwano Group's Out-Growers Scheme
 Riley Packaging bids to buy Panpaper (Kenya) Limited
 About Royal Palms Estate, A Development of Nationwide Properties Limited

Conglomerate companies of Uganda
Companies based in Kampala
Agriculture in Uganda
Kampala Central Division